Albert Tyler may refer to:
Albert Tyler (biologist) (1906–1968), American reproductive biologist
Albert Tyler (athlete) (1872–1945), American athlete